Long Puak, formerly known as Long Ballong, is a small-village found about 2 km from Long Banga in the Marudi division of Sarawak, Malaysia.

Description
It is believed that the population is less than 50 people, with majority of the inhabitants being Sabans, along with Kelabit and Kenyah people. The village's main activities are agriculture-based activities like planting paddy, fruits, raising chickens, pigs, buffalo and cows, and fishing.

The village is very quiet; most of the younger generation have gone to urban areas like Miri and Marudi in search of better living and employment opportunities. Some have also gone to nearby logging camps to work as woodmen, mechanics and other timber-related jobs.

Education
Most of the children in the village will be sent to Long Banga for primary education; for secondary school, they will be sent to Bario.

Neighbouring settlements
Neighbouring settlements include:

References

Villages in Sarawak